Kannepally is a village and new mandal of Mancherial district in Telangana state of India.

Administrative divisions
There are 24 Villages in Kannepally.
 Total 24 Mandalams

References 

Villages in Mancherial district
Mandal headquarters in Mancherial district